The ACS Style is a set of standards for writing documents relating to chemistry, including a standard method of citation in academic publications, developed by the American Chemical Society (ACS). 

Previous editions of the ACS style manual are entitled ACS Style Guide: Effective Communication of Scientific Information, 3rd ed. (2006), edited by Anne M. Coghill and Lorrin R. Garson, and ACS Style Guide: A Manual for Authors and Editors (1997).

As of 2020, ACS style guidance and best practices for scholarly communication in the sciences are incorporated into the ACS Guide to Scholarly Communication, edited by Gregory M. Banik, Grace Baysinger, Prashant V. Kamat, and Norbert Pienta. The Guide is published online by ACS Publications.

Citation format 
Abbreviations
Titles of journals are abbreviated; e.g.:
J. Am. Chem. Soc. – Journal of the American Chemical Society
J. Phys. Chem. – Journal of Physical Chemistry
J. Phys. Chem. A – Journal of Physical Chemistry (A, B, or C)
J. Org. Chem. – Journal of Organic Chemistry
Org. Lett. – Organic Letters
Phys. Rev. Lett. – Physical Review Letters
Tetrahedron – Tetrahedron
Tetrahedron Lett. – Tetrahedron Letters
Acc. Chem. Res. – Accounts of Chemical Research

Article published in a journal
Last Name, First Initial.; Last Name, First Initial.  Journal Year, Volume, Pages.

Example of a journal citation

The  are optional.

Further reading 
 Anne M. Coghill (Editor), Lorrin R. Garson (Editor). The ACS Style Guide: Effective Communication of Scientific Information. 3rd ed.  American Chemical Society, 2006.  . .
Gregory M. Banik (Editor), Grace Baysinger (Editor), Prashant V. Kamat (Editor), Norbert Pienta (Editor). The ACS Guide to Scholarly Communication. American Chemical Society, 2020.  doi: 10.1021/acsguide. .

External links 
 ACS Style Guidelines

Style
Bibliography
Style guides for American English
Academic style guides
Style guides for technical and scientific writing